Sara Gilbert (born Sara Rebecca Abeles; January 29, 1975) is an American actress best known for her role as Darlene Conner on the ABC sitcom Roseanne (1988–1997; 2018), for which she received two Primetime Emmy Award nominations, and its spin-off, The Conners (2018–present). She is also creator and former co-host of the CBS daytime talk show The Talk and had a recurring role as Leslie Winkle on CBS's The Big Bang Theory.

Early life and education 
Gilbert was born Sara Rebecca Abeles in Santa Monica, California, the daughter of Barbara Cowan (née Crane) and Harold Abeles. Both her parents are Jewish. Her maternal grandfather was The Honeymooners creator Harry Crane. Gilbert has two older half-siblings and two older adoptive siblings. Her two adoptive siblings on her mother's side, Melissa Gilbert and Jonathan Gilbert, were stars of Little House on the Prairie. In 1984, Sara took the last name Gilbert from Paul Gilbert, her mother's first husband. Gilbert also has two siblings on her father's side, sister Patrice and brother Joseph.

Gilbert graduated from Yale University in 1997, with honors, majoring in art with an emphasis on photography.

Career

Television 
Following appearances in television movies and a commercial for Kool-Aid, at 13 she landed the role of Darlene Conner, the sarcastic middle child, in Roseanne. Gilbert was a cast member in the show's nine-year run (1988–97), for which she wrote a fourth-season episode story (the teleplay was written by the Guild Writers for the show) called "Don't Make Me Over." Her contribution was considered so important to Roseanne that the show's producers juggled storylines and taping schedules to allow her to study at Yale University while remaining in the cast, shooting remote segments of Darlene at a soundstage in New York.

Gilbert has appeared on The Simpsons, 24, Will & Grace, Law & Order: Special Victims Unit and Private Practice. Starting in 2004, she had a recurring role as smart and sarcastic medical student Jane Figler on the long-running hospital drama ER; her appearances spanned seasons 11–13.

Gilbert regained a regular spot on prime time television in the fall of 2005 in the sitcom Twins on The WB network. The show was canceled after one season, when the WB and UPN networks merged as The CW and dropped a number of series. She also had a recurring role on the short-lived CBS sitcom The Class as Fern Velch.

From 2007 to 2010, Gilbert appeared in episodes of the CBS TV series The Big Bang Theory as Leslie Winkle, a scientist friend of Leonard Hofstadter played by Johnny Galecki, who had previously played Gilbert's love interest David Healy on Roseanne. In the second episode of the second season of The Big Bang Theory, Gilbert was elevated to the show's main cast, portraying again a potential love interest of Galecki's character, and at one point a love interest to Howard Wolowitz (Simon Helberg). By January 2009, it was announced that the writers did not know how to write for her character full-time, and her status was reduced from regular to recurring.  Winkle was discontinued after Amy Farrah Fowler and Bernadette Rostenkowski became prominent characters.

Gilbert was a co-host and executive producer of The Talk, a talk show that premiered October 18, 2010. Gilbert won a Daytime Emmy in 2016 for Outstanding Entertainment Talk Show as producer and creator of the show.  Her final appearance as co-host was August 2, 2019.

An eight-episode revival series of Roseanne was developed,<ref>{{Cite news |url= http://www.nydailynews.com/entertainment/tv/roseanne-revival-works-article-1.3113625 |title= Roseanne' TV show revival in the works with main cast set to reprise roles |work= New York Daily News |access-date= April 28, 2017 |language= en-US |archive-date= April 28, 2017 |archive-url= https://web.archive.org/web/20170428221922/http://www.nydailynews.com/entertainment/tv/roseanne-revival-works-article-1.3113625 |url-status= live }}</ref> with Gilbert as an executive producer. It was confirmed on May 16, 2017, and the eight episodes, picked up by ABC, began airing March 27, 2018. Due to the revival's strong ratings and positive critical reception, a second season was announced. However, on May 29, 2018, in the wake of controversial remarks made by Barr on Twitter regarding Valerie Jarrett (an advisor to former president Barack Obama), ABC cancelled the revival after a single season. Gilbert distanced herself and the show from Barr's tweets saying that her comments are "abhorrent and do not reflect the beliefs of our cast and crew or anyone associated with our show."

On June 21, 2018, ABC announced that the network had ordered ten episodes of a spin-off of Roseanne. That series, The Conners, featuring all of the regular cast except Barr, premiered in October 2018, with Gilbert starring and serving as an executive producer. In 2019, Sara, along with Tom Werner launched Sara+Tom, by combining two companies, her Gilbert TV arm, and Werner Entertainment, both of which worked after the success of The Conners.

 Film 
Gilbert appeared in two films alongside Drew Barrymore, in Poison Ivy in 1992 and Riding in Cars with Boys in 2001. Gilbert also had a feature role in Light It Up in 1999. She has had several minor roles following Roseanne, including the short film $30 (aka 30 Bucks) as part of the Boys Life 3 feature, and High Fidelity. She directed her short film Persona Non Grata in 1998. In 2000, Gilbert appeared in a production of The Hot L Baltimore as part of the Williamstown (Mass.) theater festival.

 Personal life 

As a teenager, Gilbert dated her Roseanne (and later The Big Bang Theory) co-star Johnny Galecki (their characters also dated). During their relationship she realized she was a lesbian. She remains close friends with Galecki.

In 2001, Gilbert began a relationship with television producer Ali Adler. They have two children—a son, Levi Hank, born to Adler in October 2004, and a daughter, Sawyer Jane, born to Gilbert in August 2007. For many years, Gilbert remained private about her sexuality, choosing not to publicly discuss her personal life. In July 2010, as she prepared to launch her talk show, The Talk'', Gilbert confirmed that she was a lesbian. In August 2011, Gilbert announced that she and Adler had separated amicably.

Following the breakup, Gilbert began a relationship with songwriter, music producer and former 4 Non Blondes frontwoman Linda Perry. Gilbert announced their engagement in April 2013, and the pair married on March 30, 2014. Gilbert gave birth to their son, Rhodes Emilio Gilbert Perry, on February 28, 2015. On December 27, 2019, Gilbert filed for legal separation from Perry.

Filmography

Film

Television

References

External links 

 
 
 

1975 births
20th-century American actresses
21st-century American actresses
21st-century American Jews
Actresses from Santa Monica, California
American child actresses
American film actresses
American television actresses
American television talk show hosts
Jewish American actresses
American lesbian actresses
Lesbian Jews
LGBT people from California
Living people
Yale University alumni